Alan Stanley Kornacki (born May 4, 1952, in Bayonne, New Jersey) is an American geologist and retired Army colonel, currently the Senior Staff Geochemist at Shell International Exploration and Production Inc. He received a B.S. in Geology from University of Missouri–Rolla in 1974, before completing his M.S. and Ph.D. in Geology at Harvard University in 1984, on a Graduate Research Fellowship. His dissertation focused on refractory inclusions in Carbonaceous Chondrites. He began a career in the petroleum industry in 1985 when he joined Shell USA. In 1981, he was awarded the Nininger Meteorite Award, and in 2008 he was awarded a professional degree by University of Missouri–Rolla. Alan Kornacki is most known for his characterization of wax from deep water crude oil, an important obstacle in modern drilling and refining technology, and his research on new sources of hydrocarbons such as oil shale.

Selected publications
A.S. Kornacki, R.E. Cohen (1983) On the Origin of Spinel-Rich Inclusions. Lunar and Planetary Science XIV, 393 - 394
A.S. Kornacki, J.A. Wood (1984) Petrography and classification of Ca, Al-rich and olivine-rich inclusions in the Allende CV3 chondrite. J. Geophys. Res., Vol. 89, B573 - B587
A.S. Kornacki, B. Fegley (1984) Origin of spinel-rich chondrules and inclusions in carbonaceous and ordinary chondrites. J. Geophys. Res., Vol. 89, B588 - B596
A.S. Kornacki, J.A. Wood (1984) The mineral chemistry and origin of inclusion matrix and meteorite matrix in the Allende CV3 chondrite. GeCoA, Vol. 48, 1663–1676
A.S. Kornacki, J.A. Wood (1985) The identification of group II inclusions in carbonaceous chondrites by electron probe microanalysis of perovskite. Earth and Planetary Science Letters, Vol. 72, 74 - 86
A.S. Kornacki, B. Fegley (1985) Group II Cai's: an Isotopic Case for Presolar Chemistry. Lunar and Planetary Science XVI, 457 - 458

See also
List of geologists
Alastair GW Cameron

References

Living people
1952 births
American geochemists
Harvard University alumni
Missouri University of Science and Technology alumni
People from Bayonne, New Jersey
Shell plc people